Actenochroma is a genus of moths in the family Geometridae. It consists of only one species, Actenochroma muscicoloraria, which is found in Brunei, China, India, Indonesia (Kalimantan, Sumatra), western Malaysia and Nepal.

Adults are fairly uniformly palish green, with wavy antemedial and dentate postmedial lines which are darker green, each forming a dark green spot on the costa of the forewing.

References

 

Pseudoterpnini
Geometridae genera
Monotypic moth genera
Moths described in 1863
Moths of Asia